Cyclophora staudei is a moth in the family Geometridae. It is found in Yemen.

References

External links

Moths described in 2006
staudei
Invertebrates of the Arabian Peninsula
Moths of Asia